The River Dun may refer to:

River Dun (River Kennet), in the English counties of Wiltshire and Berkshire
River Dun (River Test), in the English counties of Wiltshire and Hampshire
River Dun, an alternative name of the River Don, Yorkshire in England
River Dun, Northern Ireland, in County Antrim, Northern Ireland
 Dun Stone Beck, Horton in Ribblesdale